185th Brigade may refer to:

 185th Infantry Brigade (United Kingdom), a unit of the United Kingdom Army
 185th Aviation Brigade (United States), a unit of the United States Army

See also
 185th Infantry Regiment (United States)
 185th Air Refueling Squadron

sl:Seznam brigad po zaporednih številkah (150. - 199.)#185. brigada